Hynobius nebulosus, the Mitsjama salamander, is a species of salamander in the family Hynobiidae endemic to Japan. Its natural habitats are temperate forests, rivers, swamps, freshwater springs, and irrigated land. It is threatened by habitat loss.

References

nebulosus
Amphibians described in 1838
Endemic amphibians of Japan
Taxonomy articles created by Polbot
Taxa named by Coenraad Jacob Temminck
Taxa named by Hermann Schlegel